In arithmetic geometry, the uniform boundedness conjecture for rational points asserts that for a given number field  and a positive integer  that there exists a number  depending only on  and  such that for any algebraic curve  defined over  having genus equal to  has at most  -rational points. This is a refinement of Faltings's theorem, which asserts that the set of -rational points  is necessarily finite.

Progress
The first significant progress towards the conjecture was due to Caporaso, Harris, and Mazur. They proved that the conjecture holds if one assumes the Bombieri–Lang conjecture.

Mazur's Conjecture B
This variant of the conjecture is known as Mazur's Conjecture B.

Michael Stoll proved that Mazur's Conjecture B holds for hyperelliptic curves with the additional hypothesis that . Stoll's result was further refined by Katz, Rabinoff, and Zureick-Brown in 2015. Both of these works rely on Chabauty's method.

Mazur's Conjecture B was resolved by Dimitrov, Gao, and Habegger in a preprint in 2020 which has since appeared in the Annals of Mathematics using the earlier work of Gao and Habegger on the geometric Bogomolov conjecture instead of Chabauty's method.

References 

Conjectures
Arithmetic geometry